Primigulella is a genus of air-breathing land snails, terrestrial pulmonate gastropod mollusks in the subfamily Enneinae of the family Streptaxidae.

Species
 Primigulella augur (van Bruggen, 1988)
 Primigulella foliifera (E. von Martens, 1895)
 Primigulella franzi (Blume, 1965)
 Primigulella grossa (E. von Martens, 1892)
 Primigulella jombeneensis (Preston, 1913)
 † Primigulella koruensis Pickford, 2019 
 Primigulella linguifera (E. von Martens, 1895)
 Primigulella lobidens (Thiele, 1911)
 Primigulella microtaenia (Pilsbry & Cockerell, 1933)
 † Primigulella miocenica (Verdcourt, 1963) 
 Primigulella ndamanyiluensis (Venmans, 1956)
 Primigulella ndiwenyiensis (Rowson & Lange, 2007)
 Primigulella pilula (Preston, 1911)
 Primigulella usagarica (Crosse, 1886)
 Primigulella usambarica (Craven, 1880)

References

 Pilsbry, H.A. (1919). A review of the land mollusks of the Belgian Congo chiefly based on the collections of the American Museum Congo Expedition, 1909–1915. Bulletin of the American Museum of Natural History. 40: 1–370, pls I-XXIII.
 Rowson B. & Herbert D.G. (2016). The type species and circumscription of the species-rich Afrotropical snail genus Gulella L. Pfeiffer, 1856, based on anatomical and mtDNA data (Mollusca: Eupulmonata: Streptaxidae). Archiv für Molluskenkunde. 145(1): 69–84.

External links
 Blume, W. (1965). Die Mollusken, die Herr Prof. Franz hauptsächlich während seiner letzten Reise in Innerafrika gesammelt hat. Opuscula zoologica. 90: 1-17
 Rowson, B. (2010). Systematics and diversity of the Streptaxidae (Gastropoda: Stylommatophora). Ph.D. thesis, University of Wales, Cardiff. Pp. i–vii + 1–307.

Streptaxidae